The Guiding Light (GL) was the longest-running American soap opera.


Show development

2000 - 2004 
Claire Labine took over as head writer in 2000, but her stories focused on character development and reportedly clashed with Rauch's plot-heavy style. Labine's team lasted barely a year and she was replaced briefly by Lloyd Gold. 
Millee Taggart took the writing reins in 2002, and Taggart's run had some critical acclaim, breaking away from the organized crime and royalty which had dominated Guiding Light over the past few years.

Taggart tried to focus on more traditional story lines, including Reva pulling the plug on a critically injured Richard in 2002. During this time, Guiding Light also tried to reinvigorate the role of Alexandra Spaulding by offering the role to Dynasty star Joan Collins. 

In early 2003, veteran producer John Conboy and Ellen Weston took charge of the show. Weston had acted on Guiding Light, and had been a writer with several prime-time movie credits, but  had never been a head writer for a soap opera. Conboy's first move was to relegate several veteran performers to recurring status, including Maureen Garrett, Beth Chamberlin and Elizabeth Keifer. However, Conboy and Weston were eventually fired after only a year. 

Ellen Wheeler of Another World and All My Children fame became executive producer in the spring of 2004. Her regime addressed unresolved plots. Wheeler and writer David Kreizman won praise from viewers and critics at first. The serial won the Writers Guild of America Award for best written daytime serial in 2005 and the show was the only one nominated. But the show's ratings continued to stagnate and in early 2005, it was revealed that Procter & Gamble had ordered Guiding Light to take a large budget cut. The actors themselves would also see a reduction in salary, and long-time stars Michael O'Leary, Jerry verDorn, and Marj Dusay were taken off contract. As a result of being dropped to recurring, Jerry verDorn, the longest running actor and character (Ross Marler) on the show, quit and joined ABC's One Life to Live. Dusay and O'Leary remained on a recurring basis.

Nancy St. Alban, Doug Hutchinson, Paul Anthony Stewart and David Andrew MacDonald were fired as a result of the budget cuts. Stephen Martines asked for and was granted a release from his contract. Daniel Cosgrove, who played Bill Lewis since 2002 opted not to renew his contract and also left the show, but would return again in 2007 with a new three-year contract.  The show moved to the old As the World Turns studios on the West Side of Manhattan, as opposed to their at the time more lavish studio on the East Side of the city.

2005 - 2009 
On November 14, 2005, Guiding Light had a show make-over. In the new opening sequence, the first few scenes were presented in widescreen and then followed by a new opening theme song with new video clips, a new logo, and a new musical tune. Episodes became downloadable at CBS.com as a podcast a few hours after their broadcast. This feature was promoted at the end of each show by various cast members who urge viewers to "take the Light" with them. Around this time, Guiding Lights sets also changed considerably. Longtime sets such as Company, Josh and Reva Lewis's House, and Cedars Hospital received makeovers, and the Beacon Hotel lobby set was scrapped. Characters also started to live in the Beacon Hotel, rather than houses or apartments. The show added a new "Main Street" set which features an outdoor coffee bar ( or Company 2) and a new theater. Guiding Light also made over the Cross Creek cabin set and moved the cabin to Springfield for Josh and Reva.

In March 2006, the producers attempted to get Michael O'Leary, Beth Chamberlin, and Elizabeth Keifer to return to contract status. All three turned the offer down, after they were only guaranteed one appearance each week. In June 2006, following his Emmy win, Jordan Clarke was upgraded to contract status. Around this same time, O'Leary ended up changing his mind and signed his own new contract with the show.

In 2007, the show celebrated its 70th anniversary with two special episodes. The first episode aired on January 25, depicting the actors portraying many of the actors from the radio show and the early years of the television show. The second appeared on February 14, depicting the actors' trip to Biloxi, Mississippi to aid in rebuilding three homes damaged by Hurricane Katrina. The theme for the 70th anniversary, "Find Your Light", attempted to return the show to its roots of giving back to the community.

Starting in January 2008, Guiding Light moved from the traditional multi-camera style of filming to hand-held digital cameras. All of the show's traditional sets were scuttled and new four-wall sets were erected in their place, as well as two new permanent outdoor filming locations in New Jersey. Executive producer Ellen Wheeler was quoted in the New York Post as saying that the show didn't feel real, and that the show's new production style would have a completely different and more realistic look. The production team chose to shoot with handheld Canon XH-G1 HDV camcorders, which allowed producers to choose as many locations as they wish.

On an August 29, 2008 episode of Guiding Light, actors Adam West and Burt Ward (two Batman castmates) made their special guest appearances.

On April 1, 2009, CBS announced that Guiding Light would end after 57 years on television. The final episode on the network aired on September 18, 2009.

Plot development
A large segment of the show revolved around San Cristobel, Richard and Reva discovering they have a son named Johnathan who had been hidden away to protect him from evil Edmund. Johnathan was being raised by Richards ex-lover Olivia's sister and her husband. Cassie marries Richard and Richard's evil brother Edmund plots to keep them apart. Richard abdicates his throne after discovering that he was illegitimate. Democratic elections held a few weeks later to decide San Cristobel's political fate are halted in a coup by Edmund, who has himself crowned prince and ruler. After his coronation, he marries Springfielder Beth Raines. Edmund is later deposed by Richard using an army of mercenaries paid for by Beth's ex-husband, Phillip Spaulding. Edmund escapes the island to avoid a trial and the island becomes a democracy with Richard as the elected president. Another election is held less than a year later after a heretofore unknown Winslow son, Prince William aka Alonzo Baptiste, is discovered. This time the people vote to have the monarchy restored under Alonzo, who quickly divorces and exiles his scheming wife Camille Baptiste (who would later perish in a car accident in Europe) and allows Richard and Cassie to keep their adopted son Will, who is in reality Alonzo's son with Camille.

The second plot line focuses on the Santoses and the Mob, specifically Michelle Bauer's mobster husband Danny Santos, his sister Pilar, and cousin Tony and his sociopathic mother, Carmen. Much of Danny and Michelle's story involves fighting against the evil Carmen, until Carmen is injured during a fight with Michelle in 2002. She goes into a coma and os later transferred to a Switzerland clinic, dying at some point before the show ended. 

Reva travels through time via a painting of her ex-husband Josh's new wife, Olivia, dressed as a Civil War era southern belle, Regina Robechaux. Her first stop is an upscale Civil War era home in New Orleans where she is presumed to be the new nurse for the master of the house, Jack Robechaux, who had been wounded fighting for the Confederacy. Jack is the spitting image of her beloved Josh and she connects with "Jack." Next, she visits Edwardian England as a governess where she again saw "Josh". This time he is in the guise of farmhand John MacGregor. Finally Reva ends up in World War II Paris, this time meeting up with the real Josh who went through the painting himself. 

In 2002 Hawk Shayne returns for Reva and Josh's third wedding, mentioning that Roxie (still with Johnny Bauer)'s health had improved. Meta Bauer also departs because of her actress Mary Stuart's real life death. Meta breaks a hip in Nova Scotia, staying there for an undetermined amount of time while recovering and going to live with her younger sister, Trudy Bauer, in New York City.

In 2003 Billy, Josh, Ed, Alan, and Buzz are revealed to have been the cause of the death of a young girl, Maryanne Caruthers, when they were young men in 1977. 

Other stories featured during the "WesCon" regime included Cassie's falling in love with a "reformed" Edmund; Reva's discovering her psychic abilities; and her daughter Marah's falling in love with Sandy, a loner who talked to a sock puppet, who was initially thought to be Reva's son and Marah's half-brother. Ben Reade (Matthew Bomer), last seen as a teenager in 1997, returned to the show, being revealed as a serial killer (of non-contract, incidental players on the show) and a victim of child molestation. The story culminates with his suicide.

In November 2004 Phillip was shot and "killed" as he went on a power trip, ruining many of his relationships. The "murder" was solved in 2005 when it is revealed his father Alan shot him and then faked his son's death while secretly hiding him in a mental institution where Phillip believed he was still running the Spaulding business.

In 2005 half-cousins Johnathan Randall and Tammy Winslow become involved as a couple. Danny and Michelle Santos leave the show. Danny's mother, Carmen Santos, who is still comatose, is transferred to a Switzerland clinic where she would die sometime later. Blake's half-brother Sebastion Hulce and Bill Lewis also leave town.

In 2006, the longest running character, Ross Marler, is presumed dead in a plane crash. Phillip Spaulding is still lingering in a state of confusion somewhere out of town. The disappearing Holly Norris makes a cameo appearance before retreating back offscreen. Her daughter, Blake, becomes the Springfield Blogger, is poisoned, and falls into a coma for months. Harley Cooper  receives powers for a crossover with comic book publisher Marvel Comics, including a continuation of the episodes in their comics released. This marked the last on screen appearance of the character of Dr. Charles Grant, who would later be briefly mentioned in 2008 before moving to Chicago. Olivia discovers the woman she tried to kill, Ava Peralta, is actually her own long-lost daughter, conceived from a rape. The two ultimately reconciles. Olivia also manages to forgive Jeffrey O'Neil for raping her, but with difficulty.

Reva is diagnosed with breast cancer, and though initially hesitant to accept her illness, undergoes treatment. Her husband, Josh Lewis, remains in the dark, along with the rest of Springfield, until Billy Lewis reveals the truth with Reva on her deathbed at the end of October 2006. Reva appears to be dead at the end of the November 3, 2006 show, but in the next episode she was resuscitated. Shortly after, the Lewis' are told Reva's cancer is in remission and it is revealed that the bone marrow transplant she underwent in Minnesota did work and Reva. She has a scare in early 2007 when she finds a lump under her arm, but it turns out to be benign.

In 2007 Josh Lewis and ex-wife Reva's half-sister, Cassie Layne Winslow, marry, and half-cousins Johnathan Randall (Reva's son) and Tammy Winslow (Cassie's daughter) marry as well.  Not long thereafter, Tammy is hit by a car while pushing Johnathan out of harm's way. The vehicle was driven by Tammy's cousin Daisy's boyfriend, "G", who was hired by Alan Spaulding to kill Johnathan. Johnathan eventually fakes his and daughter Sarah's death to leave town and escape the wrath of Sarah's grandfather, Alan Spaulding. Their departure is difficult on Sarah's mother, Lizzie Spaulding, who spends much of the year trying to find Jonathan and baby Sarah. Susan Lemay, now calling herself Daisy, returns to town still a teenager, causing problems for mom Harley Davidson Cooper and step-dad Gus Aitoro. Daisy's schemes cause Gus to discover he has a long lost son, Rafe, with his ex-lover Natalia Rivera. Natalia and Rafe eventually move to Springfield. Margaret Sedwick retires and leaves town offscreen. Holly Norris is said to be traveling Europe with her grandchildren—Kevin, Jason, and Clarissa—and visiting her mother, Barbara Norris.  Holly returns prior to her daughter Blake's emergence from a coma with grandchildren Kevin, Jason, and Clarissa. Kevin and Jason return to school at Lincoln Prep and later transfer to a boarding school in Europe. Holly leaves Springfield again (offscreen), selling her house and moving back to Europe with her mother Barbara, who dies not long after. Holly then leaves Europe to live closer to her daughter, Meg Reade, presumably in Toronto, Canada.

In 2008 Harley and Gus break up. Gus is paired with Natalia, the mother of his son, Rafe, while Harley has an affair with her niece's fiancée Cyrus Foley. Gus dies in a motorcycle accident and a grieving Harley flees to Greece with Rafe after he shoots District Attorney Jeffrey O'Neil. Rafe returns to Springfield to face charges, but Harley elects to stay in Greece and breaks up with Cyrus after she learns of his affair with Cassie Lewis.  Offscreen, Harley reconciles with niece Marina for having an affair with Cyrus and her two sons, Zach and Jude, leave Springfield to live with her Greece. Marina becomes involved with and marries her godfather and her Aunt Harley's ex-husband, cop A.C. Mallet, after he divorces Dinah Marler. Marina and A.C. buy Harley and Gus's old house and finish it. Marina receives a visit by her mother, Eleni. Buzz begins dating Beth's mom, Lillian Raines. 

Harley's ex-lover Dylan disappears and is said to be out of town on business. Harley and Dylan's daughter, Daisy, remains in Springfield and has a relationship first with Gus's son Rafe (which ends when she becomes pregnant and has an abortion) and later reconciles with her ex, "G", who turns out to be Cyrus's younger brother, Grady Foley. Daisy lies under oath in court for Grady, clearing him of her cousin Tammy's death.

Harley's brother, Henry "Coop" Cooper Bradshaw and his girlfriend, Ashlee Wolf, break up. Ashlee undergoes surgery to lose weight and Coop finds himself pursued by man-hungry Blake Marler. Blake's daughter Clarissa becomes a student of Coop's. Coop later becomes involved with his ex-lover Lizzy's mother Beth Raines. Prior to her relationship with Coop, Beth gives birth to ex-husband  and former father-in-law Alan Spaulding's daughter, Peyton Raines, marries and divorces Rick Bauer, and returns to school to study law.

The Lewis family has its share of problems in 2008.  Cassie frequently sees visions of and speaks with her late daughter Tammy's ghost; Cassie and Richard's adopted son Will is found to be responsible for the death of his biological father, Prince Alonzo Baptiste, and the near death of his uncle, Edmund Winslow. Edmund lapses into a coma, thanks to Jeffrey O'Neil tampering with his oxygen tube. Will torments Cassie's son, R.J., and is later sent to a reform school after trying to kill both Josh Lewis and his Aunt Reva. San Cristobal does away with the Monarchy once again after Alonzo's death. Alan sells the San Cristobal Spaulding Villa. Meanwhile, Cassie has an affair with Cyrus Foley, resulting in her divorce from Josh Lewis.  Cassie then launches a short lived career as a petty thief with Cyrus, before selling her farm house to Natalia and moving to Hawaii with son R.J. to start a new life.

Olivia, who sells her house in San Cristobal to a married couple, receives a heart transplant—Gus's heart, following his death in a motorcycle accident.  Olivia, who has grown to love Gus, has a pretend wedding with ex-lover Jeffrey O'Neil, father of her daughter, Ava Peralta, to ease her pain. Olivia's new hobby becomes making Gus's widow Natalia's life miserable before the two finally reconcile and Olivia moves into the farm house with Natalia, which Natalia purchases following Cassie's move to Hawaii).

A movie made about Reva's life brings her and ex-husband Joshua 'Bud' Lewis closer together. Reva finds out she is, despite her age and medical condition, pregnant. Reva marries Jeffrey O'Neil. Jeffrey's daughter, Ava Peralta, becomes involved with and marries Bill Lewis while she is pregnant with Remy Boudreau's baby, Max, who dies days after birth. Ava leaves for Chicago to stay at a postpartum depression clinic and returns briefly near the end of 2008 in an attempt to salvage her relationship with Remy, who is now married to Christina Moore. Remy's parents, Clayton and Felecia, and sister, Mel, comfort Remy when Max dies and express concern about his extremely sudden marriage to Christina. Ava moves to San Francisco.

Josh and Reva's son Shayne Lewis, now wheelchair bound, returns to Springfield at the end of 2008. Father Ray Santos joins his cousin Danny in Louisiana.

Alan Spaulding develops a brain tumor, leading to a series of visions of his dead son, Gus. Alan lapses into a coma and then recovers, only to have Spaulding Enterprises and the Spaulding mansion taken away from him by his adopted son Phillip's cousin Dinah and her half-brother Bill Lewis. Dinah's mom, Vanessa Chamberlain, moves from The Beacon into the Spaulding mansion with her daughter, Maureen, and ex-husband, Billy Lewis, joining Dinah and Bill. Alan later regains the Spaulding mansion and moves back in with his sister Alexandra.

Bill Lewis faces health problems while Dinah has her second cousin, Lizzie Spaulding, kidnapped by Grady Foley. Lizzie is rescued by Bill, and they are injured in a car accident fleeing Grady. Bill falls into a coma and awakes to find that he is charged with the kidnapping. Alan, working with Grady, framed Bill in an attempt to wreck Bill and Lizzie's relationship. The charges are dropped when a warehouse containing evidence is burned in an apparent arson, but Bill and Lizzie break up because Bill, who had not regained his memory of the kidnapping and ensuing accident, could not remember if he had actually kidnapped Lizzie.

In 2009, Edmund, the former prince of San Cristobal, emerges from his coma and returns to lurking around Springfield. Edmund is revealed as the long lost father of Shayne Lewis's late girlfriend Lara. Dinah and Shayne, who has recovered from his injuries, become involved until Dinah, trying to get Edmund out of their lives, deletes a video of Lara from Edmund's laptop. 

Coop is involved in a car accident while on the phone arguing with Alan on his way to stop Beth from marrying Alan again. Coop is rescued from the car accident and taken to Cedars hospital by Phillip, who had been tracked down by Bill Lewis and who returned to Springfield to make amends for his past misdeeds. Phillip catches up with best friend Rick Bauer, father Alan Spaulding, ex-wife Beth Raines, ex-father-in-law Buzz Cooper, and Lizzie, and learns that his and Beth's son James has been sent to boarding school, that ex-wife Harley and Phillip and Rick's son's Zach and Jude no longer live in Springfield, and that Lizzie has given birth to a daughter, Sarah, who has been sent out of town with her father and Reva's son Johnathan Randall. Phillip is arrested after Lizzie calls the authorities. Coop dies from his injuries, and during his funeral Alan and Phillip get into an argument, with Phillip being re-arrested after making a plea that the Coopers and Spauldings try to get along.

Alan is persuaded by Beth and Lizzie to give Company back to Buzz and the Cooper family, only to have Buzz turn down the offer and move out of Company and in with Mallet and Marina who because of ties with past Mob Connections were put on an adoption list but most likely was unable to ever adopt until Mallet overheard Shayne tell Reva at her Baby shower about orphaned children in Bosnia. Hawk Shayne made another guest appearance in Springfield for his daughter Reva's baby shower. Olivia's feelings for Natalia grow, with Doris Wolfe trying to out them. Natalia feels guilty for having sex with Frank, who is head over heels for Natalia and pushes forward with the relationship and proposes weeks later. Natalia can't answer the proposal because of her own growing feelings for Olivia. Natalia and Frank become engaged after Olivia tells Natalia that she should marry Frank. A few weeks later, Natalia and Frank prepare to marry after Natalia's son is released from prison. Olivia finally admits to Natalia that she is love with her but tells Natalia to marry Frank because he can give her a life that Olivia cannot. Frank and Natalia's wedding starts but Natalia is unable to go ahead with wedding and runs out of the church. Father Ray Santos returns to town in time to council Frank and Natalia about their marriage and then Natalia about her feeling's toward Olivia. Natalia and Olivia begin seeing each other but are worried about how to tell their children. Meanwhile, Mallet and Marina are allowed to adopt a baby from Bosnia that turns out to be Shayne and the late Lara's son, who Marina names Henry after her late Uncle Henry Cooper"Coop" Bradshaw. Shayne finds out the truth from Dinah who found out the truth from a Nun in Bosnia who had known the late Lara. Shayne tells Marina and Mallet that he is baby Henry's real father. Remy finds Edmund dead, and Reva is arrested for his murder. Reva, however, is found innocent.

Cast
Complete cast members

Recurring cast members

Reception
Guiding Light ratings: 2000–20091999–2000 Season (HH Ratings)1. The Young and the Restless (6.8)
8. Guiding Light 3.62000–2001 Season1. The Young and the Restless (5.8)
6. Guiding Light 3.42001–2002 Season1. The Young and the Restless (5.0)
8. Guiding Light 3.02002–2003 Season1. The Young and the Restless (4.7)
8. Guiding Light 2.62003–2004 Season1. The Young and the Restless (4.4)
8. Guiding Light 2.42004–2005 Season1. The Young and the Restless (4.2)
8. Guiding Light 2.32005–2006 Season HH Ratings1. The Young and the Restless (4.2)
8. Guiding Light 2.22006–2007 Season1. The Young and the Restless (4.2)
8. Guiding Light 2.12007–2008 Season1. The Young and the Restless (3.9)
8. Guiding Light 1.82008–2009 Season1. The Young and the Restless''' (3.7)
8. Guiding Light'' 1.6

Accolades

References

Guiding Light
Television articles with incorrect naming style